Czesław Foryś (10 May 1905 – 24 February 1966) was a Polish middle-distance runner. He competed in the men's 1500 metres at the 1928 Summer Olympics. He was a law graduate from the University of Warsaw.

References

1905 births
1966 deaths
Athletes (track and field) at the 1928 Summer Olympics
Polish male middle-distance runners
Olympic athletes of Poland
People from Bochnia
University of Warsaw alumni